Heteroliodon is a genus of snake in the pseudoxyrhophiid family found only on the island of Madagascar. They are harmless to humans.

Species 
Three species are currently recognized.
 Heteroliodon fohy - Glaw, Vences, & Nussbaum, 2005
 Heteroliodon lava - Nussbaum & Raxworthy, 2000 
 Heteroliodon occipitalis - (Boulenger, 1896)

References 
 

Notes

Snake genera
Taxa named by Oskar Boettger
Reptiles of Madagascar
Pseudoxyrhophiidae